Gabriela Dabrowski and Alla Kudryavtseva were the defending champions, having won the event in 2012. Kudryavtseva decided not to participate and Dabrowski partnered with Allie Will but lost in the quarterfinals.

Françoise Abanda and Victoria Duval won the title, defeating Melanie Oudin and Jessica Pegula in the final, 7–6(7–5), 2–6, [11–9].

Seeds

Draw

References 
 Draw

Tevlin Women's Challenger
Tevlin Women's Challenger